Heramba Chandra College is popularly known as South City Day. It shares premises with Sivanath Sastri College (popularly known as South City Morning) and Prafulla Chandra College (popularly known as South City Evening).

History

In the history of education in India, the achievements of the City College, Kolkata need to be remembered for its pioneering efforts in the field of modern education in the country and for the fact that it is the embodiment of the liberal spirit of those masterminds that enriched the nineteenth-century renaissance in India.

The City College of today had its modest beginning in the City School which was founded on 6 January 1879, by the Sadharan Brahmo Samaj. Ananda Mohan Bose, the then president of the Samaj had borne the initial expenses of the foundation of the school, which was repaid within a short period. Late Sivanath Sastri was the secretary and organiser and other prominent members of the Society were actively associated in founding the school. Surendra Nath Banerjee was one of the teachers of the school at that time, because he was a friend of Ananda Mohan Bose and Sivanath Sastri having been engaged in the Indian Association, the first body which sought the country's freedom from the British.

In 1881, only two years after its establishment, the City School was raised to the rank of a College when F.A. classes were started. Since then, the college made rapid strides towards the advancement of higher education. The B.A. classes were opened in 1884 and thus, within five years of its establishment, the institution developed into a first-grade college. In 1885, a Law Department for teaching up to the B.L standard was added. The college was first established in an old house. After a short while, that house at 13, Mirzapur Street (now Surya Sen Street) was purchased for the City College.

Subsequently, a new building was erected in its place at a cost of about a lakh of rupees. The foundation of the building was laid by Sri Ramesh Chandra Mitra, Kt., B.L., the then officiating chief justice of the Calcutta High Court and the opening ceremony of the new building was performed in 1884 by Lord Ripon, the then governor general of India. In this college a successful effort was made to combine moral and intellectual training on the liberal and rational principles of the Brahmo Samaj. Ripon approvingly mentioned this feature in his speech delivered at the opening ceremony of the new building.

For some years, teaching up to the M.A standard was done in the City College. But the M.A. classes had to be abolished when the new regulations of Calcutta University came into force. In January 1905, the college was placed under the control of a society registered under Act XXI of 1860 and called the City College Institution, which is now known as Brahmo Samaj Education Society. Their objective is "to promote the cause of education - comprehending the mind, heart and body and founded on a Theistic basis to conduce to the good of man and the glory of God."

To meet the growing need of the students a new commodious building was erected in 1917 at Amherst Street now, Raja Rammohan Sarani, Kolkata on a plot of land measuring three bighas and six cottahs. Presently Heramba Chandra College is situated at 23/49, Gariahat Road. (lat=22.5155402N and long=88.3684176E) which is near to the Rabindra Sarobar lake. The college has a commerce Lab which is the first commerce lab in West Bengal. the college has two well stocked library

Notable alumni 
Rohan Banerjee, cricketer
Jisshu Sengupta, Tollywood actor
Firhad Hakim, politician
Koushani Mukherjee, Actress

See also 
List of colleges affiliated to the University of Calcutta
Education in India
Education in West Bengal

References

External links
  Official website 
www.sanjyog.in 

Universities and colleges in Kolkata
Universities and colleges affiliated with the Brahmo Samaj
University of Calcutta affiliates
Commerce colleges in India
Educational institutions established in 1979
1979 establishments in West Bengal